Prinz Methusalem (Prince Methusalem) is an operetta written by Johann Strauss II to a libretto by Karl Treumann, after Victor Wilder and Alfred Delacour. It was first performed on January 3, 1877 in Vienna at the Carltheater. It achieved a run of eighty performances. The pot-pourri overture incorporates themes from the operetta, as well as other material that might have sometime been part of the planned score.

Roles

References

Operas by Johann Strauss II
German-language operettas
1877 operas
Operas